Philippines competed in the 2008 Asian Beach Games, held in Bali, Indonesia from October 18 to October 26, 2008.

The said country ranked 21st in the said competition with only 2 silver medals and 8 bronze medals.

Medalists

Silver

Bronze

Multiple

Medal summary

By sports

Nations at the 2008 Asian Beach Games
2008
Asian Beach Games